This is a list of newspapers in Nevada.

Daily newspapers 
 Elko Daily Free Press - Elko
 Las Vegas Review-Journal - Las Vegas
 Las Vegas Sun - Las Vegas
 Reno Gazette-Journal - Reno

Weekly newspapers 
 Battle Mountain Bugle - Battle Mountain
 Boulder City Review - Boulder City
 Clark County Legal News - Henderson
 High Desert Advocate - West Wendover
 Lahontan Valley News - Fallon
 Nevada Legal Press - Pahrump
 Nevada Appeal - Carson City
 Pahrump Valley Times - Pahrump
 Record-Courier - Gardnerville
 Reno News & Review - Reno
 Sparks Tribune - Sparks
 Tonopah Times-Bonanza and Goldfield News - Tonopah

See also

See also

References

External links
  Nevada Press Association

Nevada